Rosario Soler (nickname, "La Patita"; Málaga, 16 August 1879 - Málaga, 22 November 1944) was a Spanish actress and singer.

Biography 
Rosario Illescas Sánchez was born in Málaga on 16 August 1879 in the neighborhood of Victoria. She began her career at the Teatro Vital Aza Málaga from an early age. At 16, she moved to Madrid to perform in small theaters and debuted at the Príncipe Alfonso in 1896. The same year, she traveled to Mexico and triumphed in the Teatro Principal with La marcha de Cádiz, where she got the nickname La Patita. After passing through Havana, Cuba in 1901 at the Payret Teatro, she left for Milan, Italy to study singing. She returned to Spain in 1903, where she began her stage career performing at Tivoli, el Eslava, Novedades, Vital Aza and Teatro de la Zarzuela highlighting interpretations of Mozo Crúo and La Revoltosa, among others. In 1907, at the Apollo, she performed the zarzuela, "Las Bribonas". In 1910, a few months before ending her season at the Apollo, she resigned and left the Gran Teatro. In September of the same year, she moved to Mexico, premiering two works by the Calleja.

Soler was styled "La Patita" because of the song she sings in La Marcha de Cadiz. She was described by the Spanish adjective “simpatica,” and the English word “magnetic.” She possessed a delicate beauty and charm, and a voice of light timbre, which, while very pleasant, gave a suggestion of an imperfect training. She sang chula (pretty, but of the people) parts, and all other parts she invested with her personality. Her impersonation in “La Viejecita” of a rollicking young officer, who, spurned and jeered by his fellows for not having received an invitation to a ball, masquerades as a demure little old lady to gain admission to the house, and wooes, and wins the hand of a count's daughter. The intensity, dash and delicacy of her acting, together with her rendering of the music, to which her voice is particularly fitted, were entertaining. With Los Cocineros, Soler is most closely identified. The final waltz-song which she sang, accompanied by a chorus costumed as cooks and beating time on skillets, was widely popular throughout the Mexico City. After ten years between Mexico, New York City, and Havana, she returned to Madrid in 1923 with a masterful interpretation of the operetta El niño judío in the Price theater. She retired in Nice, France. In 1931, she returned to Málaga and died there on November 22, 1944.

References 

 Rosario Soler. Una zarzuela en cuadros disolventes. Roberto Carril Bustamante. Ediciones Cumbres, 2015.

Bibliography

External links 
 Libro: Rosario Soler. Una zarzuela en cuadros disolventes.
 Blog: Rosario Soler
 Imágenes de Rosario Soler en Europeana

Spanish stage actresses
Spanish sopranos
1879 births
1944 deaths
People from Málaga
20th-century Spanish actresses
19th-century Spanish actresses
Spanish vedettes